Bogenbay Batyr was a famous Kazakh warrior from the 18th century. 'Batyr' is an honorific term meaning "brave warrior" in the Kazakh language. He was born near Syr Darya river. His father Aksha was a notable man among Kanzhigali clan. Tauke Khan, who was one of the Kazakh khans of the Kazakh Khanate, entrusted the army of 80,000 men to Aksha. He was also keen in elocution. Bogenbay Batyr inherited these abilities of his father. Starting from his childhood he studied elocution and was well known among the Kazakh Steppe. He resisted the Dzungar invasion of Kazakh territories along with Ablai Khan and played a major role in liberating the Kazakhs from Dzungar rule.

References 

Ethnic Kazakh people
Kazakh Khanate
18th-century Kazakhstani people
1680 births
1778 deaths